The canton of Dammartin-en-Goële is a French former administrative division, located in the arrondissement of Meaux, in the Seine-et-Marne département (Île-de-France région). It was disbanded following the French canton reorganisation which came into effect in March 2015.

Demographics

Composition 
The canton of Dammartin-en-Goële was composed of 23 communes:

Cuisy
Dammartin-en-Goële
Forfry
Gesvres-le-Chapitre
Juilly
Longperrier
Marchémoret
Mauregard
Le Mesnil-Amelot
Montgé-en-Goële
Monthyon
Moussy-le-Neuf
Moussy-le-Vieux
Oissery
Othis
Le Plessis-l'Évêque
Rouvres
Saint-Mard
Saint-Pathus
Saint-Soupplets
Thieux
Villeneuve-sous-Dammartin
Vinantes

See also
Cantons of the Seine-et-Marne department
Communes of the Seine-et-Marne department

References

Dammartin en goele
2015 disestablishments in France
States and territories disestablished in 2015